Coakley Cay in the Exuma Islands of the Bahamas is an  cay, located west of Great Exuma.

.

Victor George Lockhart
Captain Victor George Lockhart  

Private islands of the Bahamas
Exuma